Nukhotkolob is a rural locality (a selo) in Shidibsky Selsoviet, Tlyaratinsky District, Republic of Dagestan, Russia. The population was 46 as of 2010.

Geography 
Nukhotkolob is located 22 km northwest of Tlyarata (the district's administrative centre) by road. Khadakolob is the nearest rural locality.

References 

Rural localities in Tlyaratinsky District